Kuwait Technical College or ktech was founded 2014 to provide opportunities for students who are more oriented toward practical education rather than a more theoretical approach. It is licensed by Kuwait's General Secretariat of Private Universities Council, and offers recognized two-year Diploma and associate degree programs in addition to internationally accredited certificates in Microsoft, CISCO, and CompTIA.

Academics

Information Systems and Technology (IT)

Network Systems Administration and Security (Two-year Associate Degree)
Network Design and Administration (Two-year Associate Degree)
Software Applications and Programming (Two-year Diploma)
Web Applications and Programming (Two-year Diploma)

Business Management (BM)

E-Commerce (Two-year Associate Degree)
Management of Information Systems (Two-year Associate Degree)
Sales and Marketing (Two-year Associate Degree)

Faculty
There are over 100 faculty members & staff at ktech coming from various nationalities.

Campus
A fully integrated college campus life that contains a sport center with multiple activities and other student facilities , shops and rest areas that is serviced with coffee, food and cafeterias and other stuff shops that students requires in a campus.

References 

 General Secretariat of Private Universities Council ( PUC ). 
 kuwait technical college (ktech)
 ktech - Al Rai News paper - كلية الكويت التقنية… جودة التعليم في عالم التكنولوجيا والأعمال

External links 
 

Educational institutions established in 2014
Technical universities and colleges
Universities and colleges in Kuwait
2014 establishments in Kuwait